Lybasse Diop is a Senegalese former professional footballer.

Career
Diop began his career in his native Senegal, representing Foyer France Sénégal. Diop later managed Senegal alongside Habib Bâ during the mid-1960s.

Diop played for Bordeaux in the 1970s, becoming the first Senegalese player in Ligue 1. After injury cut his time at Bordeaux short, Diop returned to Senegal to manage Foyer France Sénégal.

Personal life
His grandson Issa Diop is also a footballer.

References

Date of birth missing
Possibly living people
Senegalese footballers
Senegal national football team managers
Senegalese football managers
1965 African Cup of Nations managers
FC Girondins de Bordeaux players
Ligue 1 players
Senegalese expatriate footballers
Senegalese expatriate sportspeople in France
Expatriate footballers in France
Association footballers not categorized by position